The WSU Championship is a women's professional wrestling championship in Women Superstars United (WSU). It is competed for in Women Superstars United, and has been defended on shows of sister promotion National Wrestling Superstars. Championship reigns are determined by professional wrestling matches, in which competitors are involved in scripted rivalries. These narratives create feuds between the various competitors, which cast them as villains and heroines.

Title history

Names

Reigns 

Combined reigns

See also
Women Superstars United
WSU Spirit Championship
WSU Tag Team Championship

References

External links
WSU World Championship

Women's professional wrestling championships
Women Superstars Uncensored